Guyana–Venezuela relations include diplomatic, economic and other interactions between the neighboring countries of the Co-operative Republic of Guyana and the Bolivarian Republic of Venezuela.

Border dispute 

Guyana and Venezuela have a long history of debate surrounding their border. In 1897, the matter was taken to international arbitration.

Venezuela claimed more than half of the territory of the British colony of Guyana at the time of the Latin American wars of independence. Guyana argues that the boundary between the nations was clarified in the Arbitral Award of 1899 signed by Guyana, whereas Venezuela called the award an "Anglo-Russian conspiracy". In 1962 Venezuela declared that it would no longer abide by the arbitration decision, which ceded mineral-rich territory in the Orinoco basin to Guyana. The disputed area is called Guayana Esequiba by Venezuela.  A border commission was set up in 1966 with representatives from Guyana, Venezuela and the United Kingdom, but failed to reach agreement.  Venezuela vetoed Guyana's bid to become a member of the Organization of American States (OAS) in 1967.  In 1969 Venezuela backed an abortive uprising in the disputed area.

Under intense diplomatic pressure, Venezuela agreed in 1970 to a 12-year moratorium on the dispute with the Protocol of Port-of-Spain. In 1981, Venezuela refused to renew the protocol. However, with changes to the governments of both countries, relations improved, to the extent that Venezuela sponsored Guyana's 1990 bid for OAS membership.

In 1999 tensions flared up once more as Venezuelan troops inundated the border areas, inciting protests in Georgetown. In 2007, Guyana claimed Venezuelan troops destroyed Guyanese gold-mining dredges by the border.

In 2013 the Venezuelan navy seized an oil exploration vessel operating in disputed waters claimed as Exclusive Economic Zones by both Venezuela and Guyana. In taking the case to the ICJ, Guyana looks to authorize the division of the area with Venezuela. The zone at issue is west of Guyana's Essequibo River. The disclosure of oil off the coast has started a discussion among Guyana and Venezuela over the border itself with both claiming the area.

The dispute was taken to the International Court of Justice (ICJ) in 2018. Venezuela did not participate in the hearing that was held on June 30, 2020, arguing that the ICJ did not have jurisdiction. In September 2020, the United States announced that it would join Guyana on sea patrols in the area. UN Secretary-General António Guterres alluded the case to the ICJ in 2018. Pressures additionally heightened when Venezuela's naval force held onto an oil research transport in 2013 and moved toward another in 2018.

On 21 January 2021, 12 fishermen were detained by Venezuelan naval troops operated in the Waini River, arbitrated to be inside Guyanese territory. The prisoners were to be detained for 45 days "pending investigation." All fisherman were released from custody by 3 February.

Trade 
In 2019, Venezuela exported US$ 8.96 million worth of goods to Guyana which consisted mainly refined petroleum. In 2019, Guyana exported US$ 73.9 million to Venezuela which consisted mainly of rice.

Ambassadors

Guyanese ambassadors to Venezuela 
 Bayney Karran 
Odeen Ishmael, 2003–2011
Geoffrey da Silva, 2011–2015
Cheryl Miles, 2016–2019

Venezuelan ambassadors to Guyana 
 Reina Margarita Arratia Díaz, 2015
 Patrick Hossain, honorary consul, 2017
 Luis Edgardo Diaz Monclus, active in 2021

See also

 Ankoko Island
 Corocoro Island

References

 
Bilateral relations of Venezuela
Venezuela